Homologous temperature expresses the thermodynamic temperature of a material as a fraction of the thermodynamic temperature of its melting point (i.e. using the Kelvin scale):

For example, the homologous temperature of lead at room temperature (25 °C) is approximately 0.50 (TH = T/Tmp = 298 K/601 K = 0.50).

Significance of the homologous temperature 
The homologous temperature of a substance is useful for determining the rate of steady state creep (diffusion dependent deformation). A higher homologous temperature results in an exponentially higher rate of diffusion dependent deformation.

Additionally, for a given fixed homologous temperature, two materials with different melting points would have similar diffusion-dependent deformation behaviour. For example, solder (Tmp = 456 K) at 115 °C would have comparable mechanical properties to copper (Tmp = 1358 K) at 881 °C, because they would both be at 0.85Tmp despite being at different absolute temperatures.

In electronics applications, where circuits typically operate over a −55 °C to +125 °C range, eutectic tin-lead (Sn63) solder is working at 0.48Tmp to 0.87Tmp. The upper temperature is high relative to the melting point; from this we can deduce that solder will have limited mechanical strength (as a bulk material) and significant creep under stress. This is borne out by its comparatively low values for tensile strength, shear strength and modulus of elasticity. Copper, on the other hand, has a much higher melting point, so foils are working at only 0.16Tmp to 0.29Tmp and their properties are little affected by temperature.

References

Scales of temperature